Hardev Singh (23 February 1954 – 13 May 2016), also known as Nirankari Baba, was an Indian spiritual guru and chief leader of the Sant Nirankari Mission from 1980 until his death.

Early life and education
Hardev Singh was born on 23 February 1954 to Gurbachan Singh and Kulwant Kaur in Delhi.  He completed his elementary education from Yadvindra public school, Patiala, Punjab and later schooling from Rosary public school, Sant Nirankari Colony, Delhi. He graduated from Delhi University. 

In 1975, he married Sawinder Kaur during an annual Nirankari Sant Samagam in Delhi.

Spiritual career
Hardev Singh became a member of the Nirankari Seva Dal in 1971.  After the assassination of his father Gurbachan Singh, who headed the Sant Nirankari Mission in 1980, he succeeded as the chief leader (satguru) of the organization. In 2005, he established the Nirankari Museum in Sant Nirankari Sarovar complex in New Delhi. Sant Nirankari Mission was established in 1929, by Buta Singh who previously belonged to the Nirankari sect. He was succeeded by Avtar Singh. The mission flourished after it shifted base to Delhi from West Punjab, after partition of India in 1947. As of 2016, the organization has 2000 centers and millions of followers all over the globe.

Death
Hardev Singh died on 13 May 2016 in a car accident on Autoroute 30 near Montreal, Quebec, Canada. Indian President Pranab Mukherjee, Prime Minister Narendra Modi, Home minister Rajnath Singh, and Congress leader Sonia Gandhi among others expressed their grief over sudden demise of Hardev Singh. He was cremated on 18 May 2016 at Nigambodh Ghat crematorium.

On 17 May 2016, Hardev Singh's wife Sawinder Kaur became the fifth chief leader of the mission.

Bibliography

References

External links
 Official biography of Baba Hardev Singh at Sant Nirankari Mission

Indian Sikh religious leaders
Indian spiritual teachers
People from Delhi
Delhi University alumni
1954 births
2016 deaths